Birrkuta – Wild Honey is the fourth studio album by Australian band, Yothu Yindi. It was released in November 1996 via Mushroom Records. It was co-produced by Lamar Lowder and Andrew Farriss.

Australian musicologist, Ian McFarlane, compared it to their previous album, "[it] continued Freedoms move towards a broader musical horizon while retaining a strong commercial appeal."

At the ARIA Music Awards of 1997, the album was nominated for ARIA Award for Best Indigenous Release.

Track listing
"Tears for Law" (Garrathiya Run) (Mandawuy Yunupingu, Daniel Watson)
"Yolngu Woman" (Mandawuy Yunupingu)
"Ngarrpiya" (Octopus) (Traditional song, arranged by Mandawuy Yunupingu, Gurrumul Yunupingu)
"Superhighway" (Mandawuy Yunupingu, Andrew Farriss)
"Bapane" (Traditional song, arranged by Galarrwuy Yunupingu, Gurrumul Yunupingu)
"Djatpa" (Mandawuy Yunupingu, Gurrumul Yunupingu)
"Timor" (Ben Hakalitz, Makuma Yunupingu, Mandawuy Yunupingu)
"Matter of Choice" (Mandawuy Yunupingu, Farriss)
"Stop That" (Stuart Kellaway)
"Lorrpu" (Traditional song, arranged by Galarrwuy Yunupingu, Gurrumul Yunupingu)
"Spirit of Peace" (Buruka Tau-Matagu, Hakalitz, William Takaku)
"Yirrmala" (Mandawuy Yunupingu, Kellaway, Gurrumul Yunupingu)
"Honey (Birrkuta)" (Mandawuy Yunupingu, Tau-Matagu, Galarrwuy Yunupingu)
"Cora" (Traditional song, arranged by Galarrwuy Yunupingu)
"Mice and Men" (Mandawuy Yunupingu)

Personnel
 Mandawuy Yunupingu – lead vocals, vocals, guitar, acoustic guitar, clapsticks
 Gurrumul Yunupingu – electric guitar, lead vocals, vocals, backing vocals, bass guitar, clapsticks, acoustic guitar, didgeridoo, clavinet
 Makuma Yunupingu – lead vocals, vocals, backing vocals, didgeridoo, clapsticks
 Stuart Kellaway – guitar, bass guitar, acoustic guitar, slide guitar
 Milkayngu Mununggurr – didgeridoo
 Ben Hakalitz – drums, kundu, backing vocals, bass guitar, flutes
 Buruka Tau-Matagu – organ, electric piano, vocals, backing vocals, bass guitar, acoustic guitar, electric 12 string guitar, flutes
 Jodie Cockatoo Creed – vocals, backing vocals
 Airi Ingram – percussion
 Lamar Lowder – percussion
 Yomunu Yunupingu – didgeridoo
 Andrew Farriss – keyboards, guitar
 Galarrwuy Yunupingu – lead vocals, vocals, clapsticks

Charts

Release history

References 

Yothu Yindi albums
Mushroom Records albums
1996 albums